Bryant is a village in Fulton County, Illinois, United States. The population was 220 at the 2010 census, down from 255 at the 2000 census.

Geography
Bryant is located in east-central Fulton County at  (40.466839, -90.095388). Illinois Route 100 passes through the village, leading northeast  to Canton and southwest  to Lewistown, the county seat.

Demographics

As of the census of 2000, there were 255 people, 96 households, and 72 families residing in the village. The racial makeup of the village was 97.65% White, 0.78% African American, 0.39% Asian, 1.18% from other races. Hispanic or Latino of any race were 1.57% of the population.

There were 96 households, out of which 32.3% had children under the age of 18 living with them, 59.4% were married couples living together, 10.4% had a female householder with no husband present, and 24.0% were non-families. 15.6% of all households were made up of individuals, and 10.4% had someone living alone who was 65 years of age or older.  The average household size was 2.66 and the average family size was 2.97.

In the village, the population was spread out, with 24.3% under the age of 18, 13.3% from 18 to 24, 27.8% from 25 to 44, 18.4% from 45 to 64, and 16.1% who were 65 years of age or older.  The median age was 34 years. For every 100 females, there were 94.7 males.  For every 100 females age 18 and over, there were 96.9 males.

The median income for a household in the village was $28,636, and the median income for a family was $28,977. Males had a median income of $31,875 versus $23,571 for females. The per capita income for the village was $13,740.  About 10.1% of families and 14.3% of the population were below the poverty line, including 31.6% of those under the age of eighteen and none of those 65 or over.

References

Villages in Fulton County, Illinois
Villages in Illinois